State Council of Russia may refer to:

State Council of the Russian Federation, an advisory body to the President of Russia
State Council of Imperial Russia, an advisory body to the Rulers of Imperial Russia